The Pau Grand Prix is an annual championship automobile road event for single seater racing cars organised by the L'Automobile Club Basco-Béarnais (ACBB) on the Circuit de Pau-Ville closed city street track in the centre of Pau, in the Pyrénées-Atlantiques department of southwestern France. The ACBB was first inspired to hold race in 1933 after the success of the Monaco Grand Prix as well as other races in Nice and Nîmes. It has been variously run to Formula One, Formula Two, Formula Three (F3), Formula 3000, Formula Libre, Formula Renault, Grand Prix and Touring car racing rules throughout its history. The Grand Prix is composed of two 35-minute races: one on Saturday afternoon and the second designated the Pau Grand Prix the following afternoon. Each winner is presented with a trophy at an awards ceremony on a podium following the conclusion of both events and the result of the second race determines the Pau Grand Prix winner.

The inaugural winner of the Pau Grand Prix was French driver Marcel Lehoux driving a Bugatti in 1933. Jim Clark of Great Britain is the most successful driver at the event, having achieved four victories in 1961, 1963, 1964 and 1965. French racers Jean Behra and Maurice Trintignant and Austria's Jochen Rindt are in joint second place with three victories each. Nello Pagani of Italy was the first driver to achieve consecutive victories when he won the 1947 and 1948 races. Jack Brabham holds the records for the longest wait between two victories as well as his first and last Pau Grand Prix wins–six years between the 1960 and 1966. The most recent winner of the event was Billy Monger at the 2019 edition.

Winners

Key:
 * – Star design denotes multiple races were held over the course of the race weekend with the final event designated the Pau Grand Prix
  – Winner of the first event of the FIA WTCC Race of France
  – Winner of the FIA WTCC Race of France's second event

References

Bibliography

External links
 

Pau Grand Prix
Pau Grand Prix